HD 191984 is a double star in the equatorial constellation of Aquila. As of 2011, the components have an angular separation of 2.52″ along a position angle of 205.7°.

References

External links
 HR 7717
 CCDM 20126+0052
 Image HD 191984

Aquila (constellation)
191984
Double stars
A-type main-sequence stars
7717
B-type main-sequence stars
Durchmusterung objects
099585